Gadgetbahn is a neologism that refers to a public transport concept or implementation that is touted by its developers and supporters as futuristic or innovative, but in practice is less feasible, reliable, and more expensive than traditional modes such as buses, trams and trains. It is a portmanteau of the English word "gadget" and the German word "bahn," meaning "track" or "path."

History

The term originated in the 2010s, mainly used within the online public transport sphere on Twitter and YouTube.

Examples
 Autonomous Rail Rapid Transit
 Monorails
 Aerial gondolas
 Guided buses
 Hyperloop

See also 
 Transit Expressway Revenue Line
 Maglev
 Ground effect train
 Hovertrain
 Aérotrain
 Suspension railway
 Transit Elevated Bus

References

Public transport
Neologisms